Gomtu was a football club from Gomtu, Bhutan, based at Changlimithang, who played in the Bhutan A-Division, then the top level of football in Bhutan, but since replaced by a full national league.

History
They competed in the 2001 season although it is not clear whether this was by right or through qualification from that season's Thimpu League, Gomtu were drawn in Group B along with Samtse and Druk Star. They lost to both teams, 1–0 to eventual runners-up Samtse and 5–0 to eventual winners Druk Star, finishing in fifth place overall (as Paro had a worse goal difference) and did not progress to the semi finals. It is not known whether they competed again, and there is no record of them competing in any future season for which records exist.

References

Football clubs in Bhutan
Sport in Thimphu